Newcastle Local Municipality is an administrative area in the Amajuba District of KwaZulu-Natal in South Africa.

Main places
The 2001 census divided the municipality into the following main places:

Politics 

The municipal council consists of sixty-seven members elected by mixed-member proportional representation. Thirty-four councillors are elected by first-past-the-post voting in thirty-four wards, while the remaining thirty-three are chosen from party lists so that the total number of party representatives is proportional to the number of votes received. In the election of 1 November 2021 the African National Congress (ANC) lost its majority, obtaining a plurality of twenty-two seats. A coalition was formed between the IFP, Team Sugar, DA, ActionSA and the FF+ to keep the ANC out. The IFP as the largest party in the coalition took the position of Mayor (Xolani Dube) and Speaker of council (Thengi Zulu), while team sugar took the deputy mayor position (Musa Thwala), ActionSA the Chief whip position (Faizel Cassim) and the DA were given MPAC.
The following table shows the results of the election.

References

External links
 http://www.newcastle.gov.za/

Local municipalities of the Amajuba District Municipality
Newcastle Local Municipality